The Canadian National Class Z-4-a was a batch of nine electric "boxcab" type locomotives built by English Electric for the Montreal Harbour Commissioners, later National Harbour Board of Canada from 1924 to 1926. The Port of Montreal decided to de-electrify its railway system in 1940, and so in 1941 the fleet of locomotives were traded with Canadian National Railway for seven steam switcher locomotives. They were given the classification Class Z-4-a by CN and renumbered. They would subsequently be renumbered in 1949 and finally 1969. Here they complimented the older GE built boxcabs, the class Z-1-a. Both boxcab types served the Mount Royal Tunnel route in Montreal for many years until retirement in June 1995.

See also 

 CN electric multiple unit Multiple unit sets used in the Mt Royal Tunnel 
 Canadian National Class Z-1-a earlier Mt Royal Tunnel boxcabs built by General Electric 
 NZR EO class (1923) smaller locomotives built for New Zealand in the same era

References

English Electric locomotives
Canadian National Railway locomotives
Electric locomotives of Canada
Bo+Bo locomotives
Passenger locomotives